Alvi may refer to:

People
 Abdul Qadeer Alvi, Pakistani politician
 Abrar Alvi (1927–2009), Indian film writer, director and actor
 Alvi Ahmetaj (born 1998), Albanian football player
 Alvi Fokou Fopa (born 1990), Cameroonian-American football player
 Alvi Haque Haque (born 2002), Bangladeshi cricketer
 Arif Alvi (born 1949), Pakistani politician
 Farrukh S. Alvi, mechanical engineer
 Hamza Alvi (1921–2003), Marxist academic sociologist and activist
 Junaid Alvi (born 1965), Pakistani cricketer
 Khalid Alvi, Indian professor
 Khalid Alvi (cricketer), Pakistani cricketer
 Moniza Alvi (born 1954), Pakistani-British poet and writer
 Raashid Alvi, Indian politician
 Sajida Alvi (born 1941), Pakistani academic
 Samroj Ajmi Alvi, Bangladeshi actress and model
 Sattar Alvi, Pakistani fighter pilot
 Shahood Alvi, Pakistani actor, director and producer
 Suroosh Alvi (born 1969), Pakistani-Canadian journalist and filmmaker
 Wajihuddin Alvi, Indian scholar
 Zahid Qurban Alvi, Pakistani politician

Places
 Alvi, Crognaleto, frazione in the Province of Teramo in the Abruzzo region of Italy

See also
 Alavi (surname)